
Bartoszyce County is a unit of territorial administration and local government (powiat) in Warmian-Masurian Voivodeship, northern Poland, on the border with Russia. It came into being on January 1, 1999, as a result of the Polish local government reforms passed in 1998.

As of 2019 its total population is 57,642, out of which the population of Bartoszyce is 23,482, that of Górowo Iławeckie is 3,951, that of Bisztynek is 2,370, that of Sępopol is 1,958, and the rural population is 25,881.

Neighbouring counties
Bartoszyce County is bordered by Kętrzyn County to the east, Olsztyn County to the south, Lidzbark County to the south-west and Braniewo County to the west. It also borders Russia (Kaliningrad Oblast) to the north.

Administrative division
The county is subdivided into six gminas (two urban, two urban-rural and two rural). These are listed in the following table, in descending order of population.

References

 
Bartoszyce